Madame Angot's Daughter (French: La fille de Madame Angot) is a 1935 French musical comedy film directed by Jean Bernard-Derosne and starring André Baugé, Jean Aquistapace and Raymond Cordy. It also featured early screen appearances by Arletty and Madeleine Robinson. It is based on the 1872 comic opera Madame Angot's Daughter.

The film's sets were designed by the art director Jean Douarinou.

Cast
 André Baugé as Ange Pitou
 Moniquella as Clairette Angot
 Jean Aquistapace as Larivaudière 
 Raymond Cordy as Louchard
 Madeleine Guitty as Amaranthe
 Arletty as Ducoudray
 Danièle Brégis as Mademoiselle Lange
 Robert Arnoux as Pomponnet - Un coiffeur
 Henri Marchand as Antonin
 William Aguet as Trénitz
 Raymond Rognoni as Cadet
 Georges Colin as Jérôme
 Sinoël as Le maire
 Pierre Labry as Buteux
 Odette Talazac as Cydalise
 Germaine Reuver as Thérèse
 Marcelle Sarret as Babet
 Nane Germon as Hersilie
 Pierre-Louis as L'amoureux 
 Madeleine Robinson as L'amoureuse

References

Bibliography 
 Goble, Alan. The Complete Index to Literary Sources in Film. Walter de Gruyter, 1999.

External links 
 

1935 films
1935 comedy films
French comedy films
1930s French-language films
Films based on operas
1930s French films

fr:La Fille de madame Angot (film)